Events from the year 1865 in Russia.

Incumbents
 Monarch – Alexander II

Events

 
 
  
  
 Federal Customs Service of Russia
 Zoological Garden
 Ufa Governorate
 Elista

Births

Deaths

References

1865 in Russia
Years of the 19th century in the Russian Empire